Charlach Mackintosh (1 June 1935 – 8 August 2019) was a British alpine skier. He competed at the 1956 Winter Olympics and the 1960 Winter Olympics.

He was from a family of Olympians, his parents were the multi-sport athlete Charles Ernest Whistler Mackintosh and Lady Jean Douglas-Hamilton (daughter of Alfred Douglas-Hamilton, 13th Duke of Hamilton. His siblings Sheena Mackintosh, Vora Mackintosh and Douglas Mackintosh all competed at the Olympics.

References

1935 births
2019 deaths
British male alpine skiers
Olympic alpine skiers of Great Britain
Alpine skiers at the 1956 Winter Olympics
Alpine skiers at the 1960 Winter Olympics
Sportspeople from London